The 1908 Colorado Agricultural Aggies football team represented Colorado Agricultural College (now known as Colorado State University) in the Colorado Football Association (CFA) during the 1908 college football season.  In their third season under head coach Claude Rothgeb, the Aggies compiled a 1–3 record (0–2 against CFA opponents) and were outscored by a total of 58 to 30.

Schedule

References

Colorado Agricultural
Colorado State Rams football seasons
Colorado Agricultural Aggies football